The Interstate Commission on the Potomac River Basin (ICPRB) is an agency composed of commissioners representing the federal government, the states of Maryland, Pennsylvania, Virginia, West Virginia, and the District of Columbia. The ICPRB mission is to enhance, protect, and conserve the water and associated land resources of the Potomac River basin and its tributaries through regional and interstate cooperation.

It was one of the first organizations with a congressional mandate to consider water resources on a watershed basis, rather than along political boundaries.

Authority
The Commission was created by an act of the United States Congress in 1940. Congress amended the law in 1970, creating an interstate compact.

Mission 
ICPRB accomplishes its mission through a variety of actions to conduct, coordinate, and cooperate in studies and programs in the areas of water quality, water supply, living resources, and land resources. The Section for Cooperative Water Supply Operations on the Potomac River (CO-OP), a special section of the Commission, was created as a technical operations center for management and coordination among the regional utilities to avoid water supply shortages in the Washington metropolitan area during droughts.

Commissioners 
The ICPRB Commissioners represent the commonwealths of Pennsylvania and Virginia, the states of Maryland and West Virginia, the District of Columbia, and the federal government. These individuals, appointed by their respective jurisdictions, set policy and provide guidance for the Commission, as an interstate compact agency.

Focus areas 

Complementing the commissioners is a professional staff that has gained a strong reputation for delivery of sound science and analysis that arms decision-makers at various government levels with the facts and technical data to resolve issues concerning the watershed. The staff efforts focus on four primary areas of involvement:

Drinking water and water resources
Throughout the basin, project expertise includes:
 Water resources operations and supply modeling 
 Population and demand forecasting 
 Flood control and flood forecast systems 
 Acid mine drainage abatement; passive treatment 
 Drinking water assessments and source water protection studies 
 River flow modeling and time of travel studies.
 Source water protection
 Groundwater
 Water supply planning

Water quality
Water quality issues addressed by Commission staff include supporting highly complex studies and projects that reap benefits both for the Potomac basin and for the Chesapeake Bay drainage, of which the basin comprises a major part. Project expertise includes:
 Stream assessments to determine impairments 
 Water quality modeling 
 Sediment transport modeling 
 Total maximum daily load (TMDL) plans for watersheds.
 GIS-based data comparison
 Zooplankton and phytoplankton assessments
 Wetlands assessment and restoration
 Fisheries management
 Aquatic habitat assessment/development
 Hazardous material (RCRA) assessments

Aquatic life
Staff in the aquatic life section of ICPRB work to evaluate and report on biological communities and how they respond to stream, river and estuarine conditions. Staff carefully measure and analyze aquatic life data in the Potomac basin and make management recommendations based on sound scientific data. Working collaboratively with other organizations, staff develop ecosystem indicators and analysis that is consistent basin-wide. Projects include:

 Zooplankton and phytoplankton assessments
 Restoration of viable American shad and other fisheries populations 
 Aquatic habitat assessments and redevelopment 
 Wetlands assessments and restoration 
 Fisheries management and flow assessments.

Communication and education
The agency’s technical expertise is magnified by a communications program that extends the impacts and results of ICPRB’s projects to the region’s public. Work in protecting and improving the region’s resources can be effective only when the public is educated about the reasons for those actions and their role in the preservation of those resources. To that end, the Commission:
 Publishes newsletters and reports
 Maintains an informational web site
 Responds to requests for information
 Reaches out to schools, citizen groups, and other organizations 
 Coordinates watershed groups conducting stream cleanups.

Cooperation and partnerships
The ICPRB works with numerous partners throughout the basin using cooperative skills for encouraging multiple jurisdictions to coordinate actions on water resource issues. This brings to the watershed needed action to address the basin’s major challenges, including water quality impairments, water supply, flooding, groundwater use, and nonpoint source pollution. The Commission can complete a range of surveys and assessments designed to increase the knowledge of the ecosystem that allows for more efficient resources management.

Regional facilitation
With the mainstem of the Potomac River forming interstate boundaries, a cooperative, non-regulatory regional organization is well-suited to facilitate solutions. With more than one-million acres of federally owned or managed land in the basin, the federal government has an interest in the waters of the basin. An agency that provides for coordinated state and federal water resources management actions can accomplish this if properly supported. Such an agency exists in the Interstate Commission on the Potomac River Basin.

Timeline of accomplishments
1940s - The Commission's first (1943) report on the condition of Potomac basin waters precipitates adoption of a pollution abatement program (1945), an intensive survey of industrial pollution (1946), and definition of a set of "Minimum Water Quality Criteria" (1946) by which Potomac streams and waterways may be judged suitable or unsuitable for several principal water uses. Concurrent to Congress enacting the first Federal Water Pollution Control Act (1948), ICPRB initiates a continuous water-quality sampling program in the basin. By 1949, ICPRB is given credit for coordination with local authorities to "radically" improve conditions on the Potomac's Shenandoah River tributary, recently referred to as a "biological desert" due to pollution from industrial waste.

1950s - ICPRB issues a major report describing the polluted Washington area Potomac and publishes the results of a study it sponsored on North Branch industrial wastes (1954). Under the auspices of the ICPRB, a group of citizens organizes the Citizens Council for a Clean Potomac (1956). As the U.S. Public Health Service declares the Potomac River unsafe for swimming, ICPRB estimates that on the average, 60 million cubic feet of sediment is deposited annually within the metropolitan Washington reach of the Potomac estuary (1957). Chairman Harold A. Kemp indicates Potomac River pollution has reached a "critical condition" with urgent need for additional sewage treatment facilities. By 1958, ICPRB is gathering and tabulating information from about 85 stream sampling stations operated by cooperating agencies, municipalities and industries. The following year, ICPRB publishes its first "Potomac River Water Quality Network," holds a "first-of-its-kind" silt control conference and sponsors a study of sediment sources in the basin with the U.S. Geological Survey. 

1960s - In 1963, ICPRB issues two reports on sediment sources and an urban sediment control program. 

1970s - ICPRB's Compact is amended in 1970, extending its authority to include water supply and water-related land use. In 1975, an ICPRB conference focuses on rising dollar and energy costs associated with Washington, D.C. metro area sewage treatment. 

1980s - ICPRB initiates regional discussion of the problem posed by invasive aquatic weed, hydrilla (1983). After Maryland (1985) and the District of Columbia (1986) initiate a phosphate detergent bans, ICPRB recommends (1987) expanding such bans basin-wide.

1990s - Maryland, West Virginia and ICPRB sign (1993) cooperative agreement on program to restore water quality to the North Branch.

2000s– In 2001, the ICPRB combined decades of data into a consistent and usable format for researchers and those working on the watershed in the Tidal Potomac Integrative Analysis Project. In 2002, ICPRB's successful American Shad Restoration Project is completed, restoring the population of this historically significant fish that once flowed freely in the Potomac but had been decimated by pollution, overfishing, and blockage over the past century. In 2004, along with other partners in the basin, the Commission organizes and leads the formation of a voluntary partnership between water utilities and state and federal agencies known as the Potomac River Basin Drinking Water Source Protection Partnership which will focus on protecting the water quality of the river as the source of drinking water for millions of people that live in the basin. ICPRB developed an index of stream health known as Chessie BIBI in 2008. It is calculated from stream macroinvertebrate samples collected and counted by state, federal, and local agencies and other groups.

2010s - In 2011, scientists at ICPRB conduct a survey of freshwater mussels in the mainstem of the River. These sensitive creatures are good indicators of a healthy waterway. Having baseline information can help determine the future shifts in water quality. The Potomac River Basin Comprehensive Water Resources Plan is adopted in 2018. The plan describes a shared vision for the basin, identifies water resources issues of interstate and/or basin wide significance, and recommends actions for achieving the shared vision.

See also
Colorado River Compact 
Columbia River Gorge Commission 
Connecticut River Valley Flood Control Commission
Delaware River Basin Commission 
Red River Compact Commission
Susquehanna River Basin Commission

References

External links
 Interstate Commission on the Potomac River Basin

Potomac River
United States interstate agencies
Water management authorities in the United States